The Florida Keys Eco-Discovery Center is a natural history museum in Key West. 
Its exhibits cover the plants and animals of the Florida Keys National Marine Sanctuary. It is operated by Florida Keys National Marine Sanctuary, NOAA, the South Florida Water Management District, Everglades National Park, Dry Tortugas National Park, the National Wildlife Refuges of the Florida Keys and Eastern National. Admission is free.

See also
List of museums in Florida

References

External links
 

Museums in Key West, Florida
Natural history museums in Florida
Nature centers in Florida